UAZ or Ulyanovsky Avtomobilny Zavod is an automobile manufacturer based in Ulyanovsk, Russia, which manufactures off-road vehicles, buses and trucks. It has been part of the Sollers automotive group since 2000.

UAZ is best known for the UAZ-469 utility vehicle, which has seen wide use as a military vehicle in the Eastern bloc and around the world. The UAZ factory started production in 1941 as part of the Soviet war effort. 51,706 UAZ vehicles were produced in 2016.

History

War and postwar
The Ulyanovsk Automobile Plant was founded in 1941 as a direct result of the German invasion of the Soviet Union. In response to this threat, the government of Joseph Stalin ordered the evacuation of strategically crucial industrial centers to the East. By October 1941, the rapid German drive to Moscow, triggered the decision to relocate the Moscow automotive manufacturer ZIS to the Volga town of Ulyanovsk. The town, already a nascent industrial center with a sufficiently developed infrastructure and a good supply of skilled workers, would be an ideal location for the reconstituted factory. It was also safely out of reach of the German army. At that time of its founding, the plant was considered a subsidiary of ZIS. By 1942, the plant began production of artillery shells and automobiles. The first vehicle produced at the plant was the ZIS-5 three-ton truck.

In 1943, when the prospect of a German victory had become far less likely, it was decided the relocated plant would remain in Ulyanovsk and be separated administratively from ZIS, which would be rebuilt in Moscow from scratch. This was in line with the Soviet post-war policy regarding various relocated industrial operations. It was considered more efficient to leave the newly built plants as is, while the original plants, provided they survived the war were outfitted anew, frequently with captured German machinery. At the end of 1944, the production of the ZIS-5 was transferred to The Ural Automotive Plant in Miass, while the Ulyanovsk plant began producing the smaller GAZ-AA in 1947. UAZ developed a prototype 1.5-tonne truck in 1948, using the ubiquitous   inline four of the Pobeda; this, the UAZ-300, was never built, due to a lack of production capacity. In 1954, production was expanded to include the GAZ-69, and the first batches were assembled from GAZ parts. Two years later, the factory was not just assembling GAZ-69s from parts delivered elsewhere, but manufacturing them in their entirety.

The connection with GAZ led UAZ to be the top Soviet manufacturer of four-wheel drive vehicles.

Golden age
UAZ began its growth away from being a mere assembler in 1954, with the creation of its own design office. It was this office, responding to a request from the Red Army, that in 1955 created a forward control van project, codenamed "Forty", on the GAZ-69 chassis. This became the UAZ-450, the first Soviet "cabover" truck. The prototype appeared in 1956, and was tested in both the Caucasus Mountains and the Crimea. Its loaded weight was 2.7 tonnes, and it, like all the UAZ-450 series vehicles, was powered by a  low-compression  inline-four (based on the ubiquitous Pobedas, but with an  bore, rather than ), and the Pobedas three-speed transmission, while the transfer case, drive axles, leaf springs, and drum brakes came from the GAZ-69.

In 1958, UAZ began production of the UAZ-450 series of trucks and vans. The first model was the UAZ-450A ambulance; with room for two stretchers and four-wheel drive, it was arguably the best in the world for use in remote areas. It was followed by the UAZ-450D drop-side pickup, which had an  payload; the UAZ-450 van, with a  payload; and the 11-seat UAZ-450V microbus.

A two-wheel drive variant of the UAZ-450 was announced on 12 December 1961, with the UAZ-450's  wheelbase and engine, as the UAZ-451 (van), UAZ-451D (drop-side pickup), UAZ-451A (ambulance), and UAZ-451B (minibus). The ambulance spawned a prototype UAZ-452GP with hydropneumatic suspension, to enable it to cross rough ground at high speed, following on the work done by Citröen on the DS19. The system proved very successful on trials, but it was rejected by the Soviet Army as too complicated, and so never entered production.

In 1966, the UAZ-451s were updated with a   inline-four (still based on the Pobedas), four-speed gearbox, and minor detail changes, plus a stronger chassis (and so higher payload). The models were a redesignated UAZ-451M (van, with an  payload) and a UAZ-451DM (pickup, with a  payload).

In 1966, the four-wheel drives were renumbered UAZ-452 (van), UAZ-452D (pickup), UAZ-452V (minibus), UAZ-452A and UAZ-452G (both ambulances, with different patient capacities). There was also the UAZ-452S ambulance, specially designed for Arctic conditions, with more heating capacity, double-glazed windows, and insulation; they proved able to keep a 30 °C interior temperature in -60 °C outside conditions. The UAZ-452 was able to cross  of snow and carry an  load. The UAZ-452s would go on to become a workhorse of Soviet agriculture and police, with the pickup proving a popular commercial vehicle. Export versions of the UAZ-452D were called Trekmaster when sold in Britain, but never in large numbers; there was also a version with a British-built dump body, the Tipmaster.

The UAZ-451S was a snow-crossing variant with front skis and rear tracks; it was never produced in quantity, nor was the UAZ-451S2, which had tracks at front and rear. The UAZ-452 also served as the basis for an articulated model, the UAZ-452P, that was never put into production.

In 1972 the well-regarded, but outdated, GAZ-69 was replaced by the more modern UAZ-469. This was developed from the UAZ-471 of 1958 (with four-wheel independent suspension, which proved too complex) and the UAZ-460. The UAZ-469 was a sturdy, but not-so-comfortable vehicle with the ability to overcome virtually any terrain, while also providing ease of maintenance. The UAZ-469 was not made available to the civilian market until the late 1980s, before which time it was built exclusively for police and military use, as well as heads of agricultural enterprises (kolhozes and sovkhozes). A commercially available variant was produced by the Lutzk Automotive Works.

Later years
In the 1990s, following the dissolution of the Soviet Union, UAZ became a joint-stock company and soon received the Golden Globe and Golden Mercury Awards for a significant volume of sales and its contribution to the Russian economy.

On 5 August 1997, the new UAZ-3160 went into production and received a gold medal at an international fair in Yekaterinburg. The car was used as the basis for the later Simbir and UAZ-3163.

In March 2003, UAZ opened an assembly line in Vietnam. On 20 November, the company produced the last UAZ-31512 and the first UAZ Hunter.

On 17 August 2005, the first UAZ Patriots rolled off the assembly line. They had new suspension, transmission and steering control and became the first brand new models of UAZ since the fall of the Soviet Union. The same year the assembly line had undergone a large-scale modernization. The company signed contracts with foreign suppliers and used a significant number of foreign components in its newest vehicles.

In 2006, UAZ opened a new control and test section of the main assembly line and presented 4 new cars at the Moscow International Automobile Salon.

In the following years UAZ introduced a number of additional options and improvements in its vehicles, such as the better heating and ventilation of the passenger compartment, engine cooling system, together with Lukoil introduced a new line of motor oils for its cars, offered Iveco diesel engines and launched the UAZ Cargo, a light commercial truck based on the UAZ Patriot.

In 2012, the Patriot and the Pickup received a new engine, ZMZ Euro-4 with European on-board diagnostics, which became the first Russian diesel engine to meet the Euro-4 Standard published in 1998. 2013 was the banner year for UAZ, with export sales increasing by 37% since 2012. The next year the sales of the Patriot rose by 10%, and the company was visited by Premier Dmitry Medvedev.

During a test drive in 2014, a UAZ Patriot crossed winter roads and frozen tundra of the Sakha Republic and reached one of the northernmost Russian ports at Tiksi, being the first car to cross the 73rd parallel north moving under its own power.

In January 2015, the sales increased by 3%. A UAZ Patriot support vehicle took part in the 2015 Dakar Rally, crossing the route of 9,295 km through Bolivia, Chile and Peru. The company finished the production of special series of UAZ Hunters, which were to be replaced by newer models; these Hunters were a limited edition and had airbrushed artistic paintings on them commemorating the 70th anniversary of the victory in World War II. In August the UAZ Patriot received new upgrades, including new paint colors, 18-inch wheels, interiors, frameless wiper blades, etc. The same year UAZ trucks were present at the Moscow Off-Road Show 2015, Interpolitech-2015 and ComTrans-2015 exhibitions.

UAZ delisted from the Moscow Exchange in July 2015.

Models

Current

Current lineup of UAZ vehicles:
 SUVs
 UAZ Patriot (UAZ-3163)
 UAZ Hunter - modernized UAZ-469B
 UAZ Pickup - Pick-Up version of the UAZ Patriot
 Trucks
 UAZ-3303
 UAZ-39094
 UAZ Professional - stretched versions of the UAZ Pickup
 Minibuses
 UAZ-2206
 UAZ-39625

Past models

GAZ-69
UAZ-469 - redesignated UAZ-3151
UAZ-469B/UAZ-31512 - civilian version of UAZ-469
UAZ-31514 - factory metal roofed UAZ-469
UAZ-31519 - modified UAZ-31514
UAZ-3153 - long wheelbase version
UAZ-3160 - rebodied UAZ-469
UAZ Bars (UAZ-3159) - a long wheelbase and widetrack based on UAZ-3153
UAZ Simbir (UAZ-3162) - a rebodied long wheelbase UAZ-469/3151

Minivan
 UAZ Simba UAZ-3165/3165m (4x2 or 4x4) - 8-seater minivan concept vehicle - not produced
 
Minibuses
UAZ-450
UAZ-451
UAZ-452
UAZ-3741
UAZ-3909
UAZ-3962
UAZ-39095
UAZ-39099
UAZ-396259
 
Trucks
UAZ-450D
UAZ-452D
UAZ-3303
UAZ-2360
UAZ Cargo

Prototypes

 UAZ Jaguar amphibious 4x4
 UAZ Sport Jeeplike 4x4
 UAZ-3171/3172 - a rebodied UAZ-469 of which the UAZ-3172 was the standard version and the UAZ-3171 was the short-wheel base version. The civil version had rectangular headlights. Never entered production.

See also

TREKOL-39294 - A Russian six-wheeled amphibious all-terrain vehicle manufactured using UAZ and GAZ products
Automobile model numbering system in USSR and Russia

References

External links

Official Website

 
Sollers JSC
Cars of Russia
Truck manufacturers of the Soviet Union
Motor vehicle engine manufacturers
Russian brands
Car brands
Companies based in Ulyanovsk
Companies formerly listed on the Moscow Exchange
Engine manufacturers of Russia